Yedida (lit. Friend) is a special education institute and village in central Israel. Located between Abu Ghosh and Ma'ale HaHamisha, it falls under the jurisdiction of Mateh Yehuda Regional Council.

History
The village was established in 1964 and was named after Jedidah, the mother of Josiah. It consists of a boarding school for people at the age of 17-50.

References

Villages in Israel
Education in Israel
Populated places established in 1964
Special education
Populated places in Jerusalem District
1964 establishments in Israel